Dinosaur Planet: Broncosaurus Rex is a role-playing game published by Goodman Games in 2001.

Description
Broncosaurus Rex is a d20 System game.

Publication history
Joseph Goodman started Goodman Games in 2001 and took advantage of the new d20 System license by publishing his first RPG, Broncosaurus Rex.

Reception

Reviews
Pyramid

References

D20 System publications
Goodman Games games
Role-playing games introduced in 2001
Science fiction role-playing games